Hypercompe is a genus of tiger moths in the family Erebidae erected by Jacob Hübner in 1819.

Taxonomy
Several species were formerly separated in Ecpantheria, which is now regarded as a junior synonym.

Species 
The genus includes the following species:

Hypercompe abdominalis
Hypercompe albescens
Hypercompe albicornis
Hypercompe albiscripta
Hypercompe alpha
Hypercompe amulaensis
Hypercompe andromela
Hypercompe anomala
Hypercompe atra
Hypercompe bari
Hypercompe beckeri
Hypercompe bolivar
Hypercompe brasiliensis
Hypercompe bricenoi
Hypercompe burmeisteri
Hypercompe campinasa
Hypercompe castronis
Hypercompe caudata (Walker, 1855)
Hypercompe cermelii
Hypercompe chelifer
Hypercompe confusa
Hypercompe conspersa
Hypercompe contexta
Hypercompe cotyora
Hypercompe cretacea
Hypercompe cunigunda
Hypercompe decora
Hypercompe deflorata
Hypercompe detecta
Hypercompe dissimilis
Hypercompe dognini
Hypercompe dubia
Hypercompe ecpantherioides
Hypercompe eridanus
Hypercompe euripides
Hypercompe extrema (Walker, 1855)
Hypercompe flavopunctata
Hypercompe fuscescens
Hypercompe ganglio
Hypercompe gaujoni
Hypercompe guyanensis
Hypercompe hambletoni
Hypercompe heterogena
Hypercompe icasia
Hypercompe indecisa
Hypercompe jaguarina
Hypercompe kennedyi
Hypercompe kinkelini
Hypercompe laeta
Hypercompe lemairei
Hypercompe leucarctioides
Hypercompe magdalenae
Hypercompe marcescens
Hypercompe melanoleuca
Hypercompe mielkei
Hypercompe mus
Hypercompe muzina
Hypercompe nemophila
Hypercompe neurophylla
Hypercompe nigriloba
Hypercompe nigriplaga
Hypercompe obscura
Hypercompe obsolescens
Hypercompe obtecta
Hypercompe ockendeni
Hypercompe ocularia
Hypercompe ochreator
Hypercompe orbiculata
Hypercompe orsa
Hypercompe oslari (Rothschild, [1910])
Hypercompe permaculata (Packard, 1872) many-spotted tiger
Hypercompe perplexa
Hypercompe persephone
Hypercompe persola
Hypercompe pertestacea
Hypercompe peruvensis
Hypercompe praeclara
Hypercompe robusta
Hypercompe scribonia (Stoll, [1790]), giant leopard moth
Hypercompe simplex
Hypercompe suffusa (Schaus, 1889)
Hypercompe tenebra
Hypercompe tessellata
Hypercompe testacea
Hypercompe theophila
Hypercompe trinitatis
Hypercompe turruptianoides

References

External links

 
Spilosomina
Moth genera

zh:灯蛾科